AM PM (stylized as AM:PM) is the debut extended play by Indonesian singer-songwriter Stephanie Poetri. It was released on 12 March 2021 by Infinite Thrills, 88rising, and 12Tone Music.

Background
AM:PM was composed in 2020 in the midst of the COVID-19 pandemic. The title AM:PM refers to the two contrasting themes featured throughout the project: the brightness of day and the darkness of night. In an interview with NME, Poetri stated,

Release
The project's first single, "Selfish", was released on 1 December 2020. The second single, "How We Used To", was released on 14 January 2021. The third single, "IRL", was released on 11 February 2021. All three singles were accompanied with music videos.

Alongside the release of the EP on 12 March 2021, Poetri released a music video for "Paranoia."

Track listing
Credits adapted from Spotify.

References

88rising EPs
2021 debut EPs